The Evangelical Lutheran Church in Zambia is an Evangelical Lutheran church in Zambia. It has a membership of 5,600 in 30 congregations and has been a member of the Lutheran World Federation since 2002. It is also affiliated with its regional expression, the Lutheran Communion in Southern Africa, and with the Christian Council of Zambia. The church's head is Rev. Alfred Chana, senior pastor.

The church was established in 1983 and registered as the Evangelical Lutheran Church in Zambia in 1986.

References

Lutheranism in Africa
Churches in Zambia
Christian organizations established in 1983
1983 establishments in Zambia
Lutheran World Federation members